Abstract Logix is an American record label, based in Cary, North Carolina, which specializes in jazz fusion, world and jam band music. As of late 2022, Abstract Logix has released 66 titles from musicians spanning the globe. In 2019 they were voted "Best Record Label" in the JazzTimes Magazine Readers' Poll.

History
The company began as a music blog started by music enthusiast and computer programmer Souvik Dutta in 2002. The blog began by making available a recording of a house concert featuring Shawn Lane, Jonas Hellborg, and Jeff Sipe. From there, Dutta branched out into direct sales and merchandising, becoming the exclusive retailer for a 3-DVD set by fusion guitarist John McLaughlin entitled This Is the Way I Do It and handling merchandising for McLaughlin's tours, while continuing to write code for IBM.

Abstract Logix's first two releases were Lincoln Memorial by Project Z (featuring Jimmy Herring, Greg Osby, Ricky Keller, and Jeff Sipe) in 2005 and Alex Machacek's [Sic] in 2006. Dutta's relationship with McLaughlin resulted in the guitarist's Floating Point being released on the label in 2008. In 2010, Dutta described Abstract Logix's roster as "musical pioneers and visionaries, old and young. Our clients include Grammy winners and musical icons like John McLaughlin, as well as young and upcoming icons of tomorrow like Alex Machacek, Jimmy Herring, and Wayne Krantz, among others."

Other notable musicians to record for Abstract Logix include Lenny White, Gary Husband, Anthony Jackson, Scott Kinsey, and Ranjit Barot. The Abstract Logix website also sells independent releases by a number of other fusion, world, and progressive artists. Speaking to The Telegraph, Dutta reflected, "We are fortunate to work with innovative musicians who are on the cutting edge and always evolving".

The label's first Grammy Award-winning release was McLaughlin's Live @ Ronnie Scott's, which received the 2017 Grammy Award for Best Improvised Jazz Solo for McLaughlin's performance on the track "Miles Beyond".

Discography

See also
 List of record labels

References

External links

World music record labels